The South 3rd Street Historic District is a U.S. historic district (designated as such on February 21, 1989) located in Chipley, Florida. The district is on South 3rd Street between Jackson Avenue (Highway 90) and South Boulevard. It contains 13 historic buildings, many of which are of the Queen Anne Victorian style.

References

External links
 Florida's Office of Cultural and Historical Programs
 Washington County listings 
 South Third Street Historic District
 Washington County listings at National Register of Historic Places

Geography of Washington County, Florida
Historic districts on the National Register of Historic Places in Florida
National Register of Historic Places in Washington County, Florida